Leonard Padilla (born 1939) opened a bail bonds company in Sacramento, California in 1975. He was chairman of the board of trustees of the Lorenzo Patiño Law School, which he opened with Judge Lorenzo Patiño in 1982.

Padilla has run for public office seven times, four times for Mayor of Sacramento, once for California governor in the 2003 recall election, once for Congress, and once for Sacramento County Supervisor. The alternative weekly newspaper Sacramento News & Review named him one of Sacramento's most interesting people in 2010.

Early life 
Leonard Padilla was born in Firebaugh, California. After graduating from Tulelake High School in 1957, he enlisted in the Air Force, serving four years before being discharged in 1961. Padilla graduated from Lincoln Law School of Sacramento in 1980.

References

External links

Bounty Hunters at National Geographic

Living people
1939 births
Businesspeople from Sacramento, California
Lincoln Law School of Sacramento alumni
Bounty hunters